The UX (short for Urban eXperiment) is an underground organization that improves hidden corners of Paris. Their work includes restoring the Panthéon clock, building a cinema — complete with a bar and a restaurant — in a section of the Paris Catacombs underneath the Trocadéro, restoring medieval crypts, and staging plays and readings in monuments after dark. The group's membership is largely secret, but its spokespeople include Lazar Kunstmann.

History
With its start in September 1981, the founders of the group stole plans of the many underground passageways and tunnels for which Paris is famous. Using this information as a base, the group of anonymous artists and citizens have since restored much of Paris's underground infrastructure, including the Panthéon clock, which chimed for the first time in many years after its repair.  The group is also responsible for over a dozen other projects, including those which the French government have not chosen to do or for which they lack funds.

Organisation
The organization is divided into teams: an all-female team (the Mouse House) specializing in infiltration, a team running an internal messaging system and coded radio network, a team providing a database, a team organizing underground shows, a team doing photography, and a team (Untergunther) doing restoration.

Untergunther's membership includes architects and historians. In October 2007, they received attention for a project, assisted by professional clockmaker Jean-Baptiste Viot, to clandestinely restore the famous clock in the Panthéon. Never caught, upon completion they announced their work at a meeting with the administrator of the Panthéon, who called the police.

La Mexicaine De Perforation (The Mexican Consolidated Drilling Authority) is another subdivision of the UX  which provides clandestine artistic events.

In September 2004, French police discovered an underground movie theatre run by La Mexicaine De Perforation. The makeshift theatre contained a movie screen, a well stocked bar, and a kitchen. Telephones and electricity were brought in from an unknown location. Movie titles ranging from 1950s classics to modern thrillers were also discovered. When the police returned for a formal investigation, all the equipment had disappeared — all that was left was a note on the floor reading, "Ne cherchez pas" ("Do not search").

Official reaction
Parisian's authorities oppose the group's actions and have started a police unit to track the group through the sewers and catacombs of Paris in an attempt to apprehend and charge its members.

Charges were brought against the four Untergunther restorers of the Pantheon clock, but at trial, after 20 minutes' deliberation, the judge ruled in their favor. One of the government's prosecutors referred to the charges as "stupid".

References

Sources
"Urban eXperiment, the book by Lazar Kunstmann, the spokesman for the UX"
"Underground ‘terrorists’ with a mission to save city’s neglected heritage", The Times, 29 Sep 2007

External links 
 Untergunther web site
 Pantheon, user's guide - The movie about the Untergunther and La Mexicaine De Perforation
 The New French Hacker-Artist Underground
 "Interview with Lazar Kunstman about the underground cinema project"
 Underground cinema programming guide
"UnterGunther: French Urban Explorers Sneak Into Pantheon For A Year, Repair 150-yo Clock", greg.org

Clandestine groups
Culture of Paris
Subterranea (geography)
Organizations based in Paris